Hearts Are Trumps is a 1920 German silent film directed by Ewald André Dupont and starring Hermann Vallentin, Hans Mierendorff and Adele Sandrock.

The film's sets were designed by the art director Robert A. Dietrich.

Synopsis
In order to convince his idealistic son that true love does not exist, an industrialist hires a poor woman to convince him. However they fall in love and end up marrying.

Cast
 Hermann Vallentin as Sebaldus Dühringer
 Hans Mierendorff as Dühringer jr.
 Adele Sandrock as Gelähmte Mutter
 Georg John as Dunkler mann
 Leonhard Haskel as Tinis Vater
 Marie Louise Jürgens as Tini Holm
 Hugo Döblin

References

Bibliography
 Hans-Michael Bock and Tim Bergfelder. The Concise Cinegraph: An Encyclopedia of German Cinema. Berghahn Books, 2009.

External links

1920 films
Films of the Weimar Republic
German silent feature films
Films directed by E. A. Dupont
German black-and-white films
Films based on short fiction
1920s German films